Puneyeh (also Romanized as Pūneyeh) is a village in Sharvineh Rural District, Kalashi District, Javanrud County, Kermanshah Province, Iran. At the 2006 census, its population was 49, in 9 families.

References 

Populated places in Javanrud County